The 2020 International Rules Series was to be the 21st International Rules Series contested by Gaelic footballers from Ireland and Australian footballers from Australia. The series would have been held in Ireland and was to be the first series to be arranged by the Gaelic Athletic Association (GAA) and Australian Football League (AFL) since November 2017. It was cancelled in April 2020 amid the COVID-19 pandemic in the Republic of Ireland.

Background
The previous series between the countries had been held in and won by Australia in November 2017. As the GAA had scheduled an exhibition hurling match between Galway and Kilkenny at the Sydney Showground Stadium in November 2018, the two associations met to discuss the prospect of holding a series the following year. As time passed, plans for a series in 2019 did not materialise, and the GAA eventually confirmed that insufficient time remained to stage the event. In November 2019 the AFL and GAA proposed dates for a two-test series in 2020 to be held in Ireland. The GAA also proposed to hold a memorial ahead of the second test in commemoration of the 100th anniversary of the Bloody Sunday massacre, which saw fourteen civilians killed at a Gaelic football match at Croke Park during the Irish War of Independence. On 4 April 2020, during the coronavirus pandemic, the AFL announced the cancellation of the series.

Outcome
The 2020 Leinster Senior Football Championship Final (featuring Dublin, who won) was held on the date originally intended for the second test, with the centenary commemoration plan happening around this and the 2020 Munster Senior Football Championship Final the following day (that match by coincidence featuring Tipperary, who also won — this being the more surprising result).

See also
 International rules football
 Relationship between Gaelic football and Australian rules football

References

International Rules Series
International Rules Series
International Rules series
International sports competitions hosted by Ireland
International Rules Series